Daniel Wroughton Craig (born 2 March 1968 in Chester, England) is a British actor.

Craig is the sixth actor to play secret agent James Bond in the Bond film series, starring in five films from 2006 to 2021. He received a nomination for the BAFTA Award for Best Actor in a Leading Role for his first film as Bond, Casino Royale (2006). He also won a Critics' Choice Movie Award for Best Actor in an Action Movie for Skyfall (2012) and was nominated again for the same award for Spectre (2015).

At the beginning of his career, Craig starred in various independent British films. He received three nominations at the British Independent Film Awards, winning Best Actor for Some Voices (2000), and won the London Film Critics' Circle Award for British Actor of the Year for Enduring Love (2004). His other non-Bond appearances since 2006 include Infamous (2006), which earned him a nomination for the Independent Spirit Award for Best Supporting Male, Cowboys & Aliens and The Girl with the Dragon Tattoo (both 2011), for which he received nominations for various awards. His performance as the private detective Benoit Blanc in the films Knives Out (2019) and its sequel Glass Onion: A Knives Out Mystery (2022) earned him two nominations for the Golden Globe Award for Best Actor – Motion Picture Musical or Comedy.

In 2007, Craig was invited to join the Academy of Motion Picture Arts and Sciences. In 2021, he was honoured with a star on the Hollywood Walk of Fame, and with a CMG in the 2022 New Year's Honours by Queen Elizabeth II.

Awards and nominations

Notes

References

External links
 

Craig, Daniel